Échourgnac is a commune in the Dordogne department in Nouvelle-Aquitaine in southwestern France.

It is the site of a Cistercian abbey, Notre-Dame de Bonne Esperance, which is renowned for producing cheese.

Population

See also
Communes of the Dordogne department

References

External links

Echourgnac Abbey website

Communes of Dordogne